Looni Salyal is a Town and Capital of Union Council Looni, Tehsil Kallar Syedan, District Rawalpindi

Language
 Pothwari language: 90%
 Urdu 5%
 Pashto 3%
 Other 2%

External links
 https://www.youtube.com/watch?v=Xe2PJCYCdKY
 http://loonisalyal.blogspot.com/2012/03/looni-salyal-photo-album.html
 http://wikimapia.org/7902205/Looni-Salyal

Populated places in Kallar Syedan Tehsil
Towns in Kallar Syedan Tehsil
Union councils of Kallar Syedan Tehsil